Cecilia Yeung Man-wai (楊文蔚; born 18 September 1994) is a high jumper from Hong Kong. She won a silver medal at the 2017 Asian Championships and placed fifth at the 2018 Asian Games.

References

Hong Kong female high jumpers
1994 births
Living people
Athletes (track and field) at the 2018 Asian Games
Asian Games competitors for Hong Kong